The Eastern Women's Open was a golf tournament on the LPGA Tour from 1949 to 1961. It was played at four different courses in New Jersey, Massachusetts and Pennsylvania.

Tournament locations

Winners
Eastern Open
1961 Mary Lena Faulk
1960 Mickey Wright
1956-59 No tournament
1955 Louise Suggs
1954 No tournament
1953 Betsy Rawls
1952 Betsy Rawls
1951 Beverly Hanson
1950 Patty Berg
1949 Babe Zaharias

References

1949 establishments in New Jersey
1961 disestablishments in Pennsylvania
Former LPGA Tour events
Golf in New Jersey
Golf in Massachusetts
Golf in Pennsylvania
History of Middlesex County, Massachusetts
Newton, Massachusetts
Recurring sporting events established in 1949
Recurring sporting events disestablished in 1961
Sports competitions in Massachusetts
Sports in Middlesex County, Massachusetts
Tourist attractions in Middlesex County, Massachusetts
History of women in New Jersey
History of women in Pennsylvania
History of women in Massachusetts